Glen Alum is an unincorporated community in Mingo County, West Virginia, United States.

The community derives its name from the local Glen Alum Coal Company.

References 

Unincorporated communities in West Virginia
Unincorporated communities in Mingo County, West Virginia
Coal towns in West Virginia